Hans Wolfgang Daigeler (February 21, 1945 – November 9, 1995) was a politician in Ontario, Canada. He served as a Liberal member of the Legislative Assembly of Ontario from 1987 to 1995

Background
Daigeler was educated at the University of Würzburg in West Germany, the University of Fribourg in Switzerland and Carleton University in Ottawa, Ontario, Canada.  He received a Doctorate in Theology, and worked as a research and planning officer. Daigeler was a Roman Catholic, and a member of the Knights of Columbus.

Politics
He was elected to the Carleton Separate School Board in 1982 and 1985. As a trustee, he took a particular interest in providing services for children with developmental disabilities. He was very active in the planning of the first Canadian Christian Festival, held in 1982 in Ottawa.

He ran for the Ontario legislature in the 1981 provincial election, and finished second against Progressive Conservative Bob Mitchell in the riding of Carleton (future New Democratic Party MP Judy Wasylycia-Leis finished third).  He ran again in the 1985 provincial election, and finished a much closer second against Mitchell.

Daigeler challenged Mitchell a third time in the 1987 provincial election, and defeated him by 3,636 votes in the redistributed riding of Nepean.  His victory occurred amid a landslide majority win for the Liberal Party under David Peterson. Daigeler served as a parliamentary assistant from 1989 to 1990, and was known for being on the right-wing of the Liberal Party.

The Liberals were defeated by the Ontario New Democratic Party in the 1990 provincial election, although Daigeler was personally re-elected with an increased majority.  In opposition, he served as his party's critic for Training, Colleges and Universities and Transportation.

The Progressive Conservatives won a majority government in the 1995 provincial election on June 8, 1995, and Daigeler lost to PC candidate John Baird by just under 4,000 votes.

After politics
Daigeler died by suicide on November 9, 1995, barely four months after his electoral defeat. The Ontario legislature formally paid tribute to Daigeler on November 14 of the same year.

Electoral record

References

External links
 

1945 births
1995 deaths
Canadian Roman Catholics
Carleton University alumni
West German emigrants to Canada
Ontario Liberal Party MPPs
Politicians from Ottawa
University of Fribourg alumni
University of Würzburg alumni